Siseh Garag may refer to:
 Siseh Garag-e Olya
 Siseh Garag-e Sofla